The term "Arabian horse" may refer to:

 Arabian horse, a breed of horse originating from the Arabian Peninsula
 Arab (horse), a British Thoroughbred racehorse foaled in 1824
 Arabian Horse (album), a music album by GusGus

See also
 Part-Arabian, the general term for horses crossbred with Arabian lines
 Anglo-Arabian, a crossbred with Thoroughbred lines considered a separate breed in some nations
 Arabian Horse Association (AHA), a national organization in the United States that is the breed registry for Arabian horses